Ecteneolus flohri is a species of beetle in the family Cerambycidae, and the only species in the genus Ecteneolus. It was described by Henry Walter Bates in 1885.

References

Pogonocherini
Beetles described in 1885